Thomas or Tom Dickinson may refer to: 
 Thomas Dickenson, or Dickinson, merchant and politician of York, England
 Thomas R. Dickinson, United States Army general
 J. Thomas Dickinson, American physicist and astronomer
 Tom Dickinson (cricketer),  Australian-born cricketer in England
 Tom Dickinson (American football), American football player